Bindhumalini Narayanaswamy or simply Bindhumalini is an Indian singer, composer, and graphic designer. She has received National Film Award for Best Female Playback Singer (2018) and Filmfare Award for Best Female Playback Singer - Kannada (2019) for her songs in the movie Nathicharami. She has composed and recorded songs for films and albums in Tamil, Hindi, and Kannada languages.

Personal life
Bindumalini was born in Chennai in a musical family. Her mother N. Vishalakshi is a graded Akasvani Carnatic singer and grandmother Seetha Doraiswamy was a known Jal Tarang instrumentalist. She holds a degree in Graphic design from the National Institute of Design. 

Bindumalini married Vasu Dixit, a vocalist from Bangalore, who runs a folk-rock fusion music band called Swarathma.

Career
Trained both in Carnatic and Hindustani music, Bindumalini was influenced by the poems of saint Kabir and the songs of Kumar Gandharva.

Bindumalini's album ‛Suno Bhai’, a collection of Saint Kabir's poems, was a collaboration with Vedanth Bharadwaj. 

As composer
Bindumalini scored music for the 2016 Tamil movie Aruvi with Vedanth Bharadwaj. In Kannada, she first collaborated with Ananya Kasaravalli and scored music for the movie ‛Harikatha Prasanga’ which won Best Film award at the 9th edition of Bangalore International Film Festival, 2017. In 2018, Bindumalini composed music for the movie Nathicharami which brought her a National award. Incidentally, most of her movies were women-centric.

Awards 
 2018 - National Film Award for Best Female Playback Singer - "Mayavi manave" - Nathicharami
 2019 - Filmfare Award for Best Female Playback Singer - Kannada - "Bhavalokada bhrameya" - Nathicharami

Filmography 

In her movies as composer, most of the songs sung by Bindumalini herself.

Discography

References

External links
 

Indian women singers
Kannada playback singers
Kannada film score composers
Tamil playback singers
1982 births
Living people
Best Female Playback Singer National Film Award winners